James & Ernie are an American Navajo comedy duo consisting of James Junes and Ernest "Ernie" David Tsosie III.

Early life
James Junes grew up in the Kirtland, New Mexico area, and Ernie Tsosie, 45 as of April 2012, was born in Fort Defiance, Arizona.

Filmography
 James & Ernie-fied (DVD) (2005), live performance in Farmington, NM
 Mile Post 398 (2007),  Feature film debut
 Turquoise Rose (2007)
 James & Ernie Comedy: Fun in the Sun (DVD) (2008)
 Blue Gap Boy'z (2008)
 Pete & Cleo (2010)

Awards

External links

References

American male comedians
American comedians
American satirists
American comedy duos
Navajo people